= Baden-Württembergische Theatertage =

Theatre festival in Baden-Württemberg, Germany

Coordinates: 49.146°N 9.223°E

Baden-Württembergische Theatertage is a theatre festival in Baden-Württemberg, Germany taking place every two years since 1968.
